Rutherglen is a wine-producing area around the town of Rutherglen in North East Victoria zone of the state of Victoria in Australia. The area is particularly noted for its sweet fortified wines.

Climate and geography

Rutherglen features a Mediterranean climate (Csa) with hot, dry summers and cool, damp winters. Climate data is sourced from Rutherglen Research; established in 1912 and still operating today.

Grapes and wine
A wide variety of grapes flourish in Rutherglen thanks to its sunny and dry climate.
Grapes grown in this region include Durif, Muscat, Tempranillo, Marsanne, chardonnay, cabernet sauvignon, Shiraz, Tokay (Muscadelle).

Wineries

Winemakers of Rutherglen
The Winemakers of Rutherglen formed into a membership based incorporated association in 1992. 18 wineries now make up the Winemakers of Rutherglen.
Member wineries are
All Saints Estate, 
Anderson Winery, 
Andrew Buller Wines, 
Buller Wines, 
Campbells Wines, 
Chambers Rosewood, 
Cofield Wines, 
John Gehrig wines, 
Jones winery, 
Morris wines, 
Mount Prior vineyard, 
Pfeiffer wines, 
Rutherglen estates, 
Scion vineyard, 
Stanton & Killeen, 
St Leonards vineyard, 
Valhalla wines, 
Warrabilla wines,

Other Rutherglen wineries
In recent years, Rutherglen has seen a number of smaller new wineries emerge varying in size and production. Some have opted to open a cellar door.
 Calico Town Wines
 Lilliput Wines

References

Wine styles of Rutherglen by Australian wine critic, James Halliday
Rutherglen Tokay and Muscat by U.S. wine critic Robert M. Parker, Jr.

Wine regions of Victoria (Australia)